Venecia Airport  is a public use airport located near Venecia in the Beni Department of Bolivia.

See also

Transport in Bolivia
List of airports in Bolivia

References

External links 
OpenStreetMap - Venecia
OurAirports - Venecia
Fallingrain - Venecia Airport

Airports in Beni Department